The Hague Open (also formally known for sponsorship reasons as the Siemens Open and the Sport 1 Open) is a professional tennis tournament played on outdoor red clay courts. It is currently part of the Association of Tennis Professionals (ATP) Challenger Tour. It is held annually in Scheveningen, Netherlands, since 1993, which makes it one of the oldest tournaments in the country. In its history, the event featured world-class players including Marat Safin, Marcelo Ríos, David Nalbandian, Nikolay Davydenko, Gaël Monfils and Richard Gasquet. The 26th edition of The Hague Open took place on July 16–22, 2018.

Past finals

Singles

Doubles

External links
Official website
ATP Site
ITF Search

 
ATP Challenger Tour
Tretorn SERIE+ tournaments
Clay court tennis tournaments
Tennis tournaments in the Netherlands
Sports competitions in The Hague